Sophisticated Approach is an album by the Stan Kenton Orchestra recorded in 1961 and released by Capitol Records.
In 2006, Sophisticated Approach was digitally remastered and reissued on CD for the first time by Capitol Records/Blue Note Records and included six bonus tracks, including the non-album single, "Magic Moment".

Reception

The Allmusic review by Ron Wynn noted "Sophisticated Approach features the ensemble when it was beginning to acquire a reputation for being more interested in structure and discipline than swing. The arrangements are tight, there's a minimum of solo space, and the songs are uneven". On All About Jazz Chris May said "Listening to Sophisticated Approach for more than about five minutes is an experience akin to having a sumo wrestler sit on your face. It isn't fun, it isn't jazz, and you need to come up for air".

Track listing
 "But Beautiful" (Jimmy Van Heusen, Johnny Burke) - 3:18
 "Darn That Dream" (Van Heusen, Eddie DeLange) - 2:12
 "It Might As Well Be Spring" (Richard Rodgers, Oscar Hammerstein II) - 5:12
 "Moonlight Becomes You" (Van Heusen, Burke) - 3:50
 "How Do I Look In Blue" (Gene Roland, Johnny Richards) - 2:50
 "You Stepped Out of a Dream" (Nacio Herb Brown, Gus Kahn) - 2:52
 "How Long Has This Been Going On?" (George Gershwin, Ira Gershwin) - 4:32
 "Memoirs of a Lady" (Richards, Blanca Webb) -	2:48
 "Time After Time" (Jule Styne, Sammy Cahn) - 4:16
 "Easy to Love" (Cole Porter) - 2:53
 "My One and Only Love" (Guy Wood, Robert Mellin) - 2:37
 "Like Someone in Love" (Van Heusen, Burke) - 4:35
Recorded at Capitol Studios in Hollywood, CA on July 5, 1961 (tracks 1-7 & 12) and July 7, 1961 (tracks 8-11).

In 2006, Sophisticated Approach was digitally remastered and reissued on CD with the bonus tracks:

13. "Some Enchanted Evening" (R. Rogers, O. Hammerstein) - 3:27

14. "Make Someone Happy" (Styne, Comden, Green) - 3:09

15. "Come Rain or Come Shine" (H. Arlen, J. Mercer) - 2:29

16. "Gigi" (A. J. Lerner, F. Lowe) - 2:59

17. "Bewitched, Bothered, and Bewildered" (R. Rogers, L. Hart) - 2:32

18. "Magic Moment" (H, Dietz, A. Schwartz) - 2:56
Recorded at Capitol Studios in Hollywood, CA on December 5, 6 & 12, 1961

Personnel
Stan Kenton - piano, conductor
Bob Behrendt, Bud Brisbois, Dalton Smith, Bob Rolfe - trumpet
Bob Fitzpatrick, Bud Parker,  Jack Spurlock - trombone
Jim Amlotte - bass trombone 
Dave Wheeler - bass trombone, tuba
Dwight Carver, Keith LaMotte, Gene Roland, Carl Saunders - mellophone
Gabe Baltazar - alto saxophone
Sam Donahue, Paul Renzi - tenor saxophone
Marvin Holladay - baritone saxophone
Wayne Dunstan - baritone saxophone, bass saxophone
Red Mitchell - bass 
Jerry McKenzie - drums 
Lennie Niehaus - arranger

References

Stan Kenton albums
1962 albums
Capitol Records albums
Albums conducted by Stan Kenton

Albums recorded at Capitol Studios
Albums produced by Lee Gillette